José Ignacio Cabezón Lorenzo (1954 – 8 December 2021) was a Spanish politician and doctor.

Biography
Cabezón ran for mayor of Neda in the 2007 municipal election as a member of Terra Galega. Thanks to a coalition with the People's Party, he was elected. In 2011, he ran as a member of the People's Party of Galicia and was re-elected with an absolute majority.

He died on 8 December 2021 at the age of 67.

References

1954 births
2021 deaths
People's Party (Spain) politicians
People from Ferrol, Spain
Mayors of places in Galicia